In theoretical physics, a bare particle is an excitation of an elementary quantum field. Such a particle is not identical to the particles observed in experiments: the real particles are dressed particles that also include additional particles surrounding the bare one.

Quantum field theory